Kjell Arne Hasselqvist (born July 1, 1949 in Eskilstuna) is a Swedish sprint canoer who competed in the mid-1970s. He was eliminated in the semifinals of the K-4 1000 m event at the 1976 Summer Olympics in Montreal, Quebec, Canada.

References
 Sports-Reference.com profile

1949 births
Canoeists at the 1976 Summer Olympics
Living people
Olympic canoeists of Sweden
Swedish male canoeists
People from Eskilstuna
Sportspeople from Södermanland County